Darío Valenzuela Van Treek (born 1961) is a Chilean engineer and politician who served as mayor of Rancagua.

References

1961 births
Living people 
Chilean people 
Chilean people of Dutch descent 
20th-century Chilean politicians
Instituto O'Higgins de Rancagua alumni
Pontifical Catholic University of Valparaíso alumni
Socialist Party of Chile politicians
Party for Democracy (Chile) politicians
Popular Unitary Action Movement politicians
Chilean Freemasons